Vivien Colober (born 6 October 1990) is a French slalom canoeist who competed at the international level from 2007 to 2015.

He won a silver medal in the K1 team event at the 2011 ICF Canoe Slalom World Championships in Bratislava and bronze medal in the same event at the 2011 European Championships in La Seu d'Urgell.

World Cup individual podiums

References

French male canoeists
Living people
1990 births
Medalists at the ICF Canoe Slalom World Championships